The 1929 Finnish football championship was the 21st season of Finnish football. This was the last time the championship was organized in tournament form before the foundation of the Mestaruussarja.

A total of 22 teams took part in the competition with Helsingin Palloseura and IFK Helsingfors meeting in the final.

Quarterfinals 

|}

Semifinals 

|}

Final

References 

 https://web.archive.org/web/20170219000053/http://www.jukkajoutsi.com/helsinkifutis.html
 https://web.archive.org/web/20160305120046/http://www.urheilumuseo.fi/Portals/47/Arkistotiedostot/2742/2742_SUa_SPL_toimintakertomukset_1907-35_4.pdf

1929 in Finnish football
Finnish Football Championship